The UB postcode area, also known as the Southall postcode area, is a group of eleven postcode districts in England, within six post towns. These cover parts of western and north-western Greater London, plus a very small part of Buckinghamshire. The letters in the postcodes are the phonemic abbreviation of Uxbridge.
 
The main sorting office is in Greenford (Green Park Way) and the area served includes much of the London Borough of Hillingdon and the western part of the London Borough of Ealing, while the western part of UB9 covers a small part of Buckinghamshire, the southern part of UB2 covers a very small part of the London Borough of Hounslow, and a very small part of UB5 lies within the London Borough of Harrow.



Coverage
The approximate coverage of the postcode districts:

|-
! UB1
| SOUTHALL
| Southall (north)
| Ealing
|-
! UB2
| SOUTHALL
| Southall (south), Norwood Green
| Ealing
|-
! style="background:#FFFFFF;"|UB3
| style="background:#FFFFFF;"|SOUTHALL
| style="background:#FFFFFF;"|
| style="background:#FFFFFF;"|non-geographic
|-
! UB3
| HAYES
| Hayes (south), Harlington
| Hillingdon
|-
! UB4
| HAYES
| Hayes (north), Yeading
| Hillingdon
|-
! style="background:#FFFFFF;"|UB5
| style="background:#FFFFFF;"|GREENFORD
| style="background:#FFFFFF;"|
| style="background:#FFFFFF;"|non-geographic
|-
! UB5
| NORTHOLT
| Northolt
| Ealing, Harrow, Hillingdon
|-
! UB6
| GREENFORD
| Greenford, Perivale
| Ealing
|-
! UB7
| WEST DRAYTON
| West Drayton, Harmondsworth, Sipson, Yiewsley, Longford
| Hillingdon
|-
! style="background:#FFFFFF;"|UB8
| style="background:#FFFFFF;"|WEST DRAYTON
| style="background:#FFFFFF;"|
| style="background:#FFFFFF;"|non-geographic
|-
! UB8
| UXBRIDGE
| Uxbridge, Cowley, Hillingdon (part)
| Hillingdon
|-
! UB9
| UXBRIDGE
| Denham, Harefield, Tatling End (east)
| Hillingdon, Buckinghamshire
|-
! UB10
| UXBRIDGE
| Hillingdon, Ickenham
| Hillingdon
|-
! UB11
| UXBRIDGE
| Stockley Park
| Hillingdon
|-
! style="background:#FFFFFF;"|UB18
| style="background:#FFFFFF;"|GREENFORD
| style="background:#FFFFFF;"|Spring International
| style="background:#FFFFFF;"|non-geographic
|}

Map

See also
Postcode Address File
List of postcode areas in the United Kingdom

References

External links
 Royal Mail's Postcode Address File
A quick introduction to Royal Mail's Postcode Address File (PAF)

Postcode areas covering London
Postcode areas covering South East England
Media and communications in the London Borough of Ealing
Media and communications in the London Borough of Hillingdon